Constantinople is a non-fiction travelogue book by Edmondo de Amicis published in 1877 regarding Constantinople in the Ottoman Empire, now Istanbul.

Alberto Brambilla of Sorbonne University wrote that the publication of the book and its reception were evidence of Amicis being "one of the best-known Italian authors  abroad".

Release
The first edition was published in 1877. The original work had two volumes. Cesare Biseo illustrated an 1882 edition, and Brambilla wrote that this one "will help shape the European imagination towards Istanbul, and the Orient in general." Multiple translations were derived from the Biseo version.

In 2013 a new English translation by Stephen Parkin was released.

A Turkish translation under the title İstanbul was published by Pegasus Yayınları.

Reception
Orhan Pamuk gave a positive reception to the book and Umberto Eco himself used the guide when visiting Constantinople.

PD Smith of The Guardian wrote that the book is "A wonderfully eloquent account".

William Armstrong in Hürriyet Daily News called it "An orientalist bore" with "annoyingly purple prose". Armstrong stated "it isn’t clear what distinguishes De Amicis’ memoir from the dozens of similar tomes written by intrepid Europeans at the time."

References
  - The document includes an extended English abstract.

Notes

External links

 Constantinople, 1896 English translation by Caroline Tilton, also at Hathi Trust (Harvard U copy and University of Michigan copy)
 Constantinople Volume I, 1896 English translation by Maria Hornor Lansdale, Merrill and Baker. alternate printing by Henry T. Coates & Co. - Alternate links at Project Gutenberg
 Constantinople Volume II, 1896 English translation by Maria Hornor Lansdale, Henry T. Coates & Co. - Alternate links at Project Gutenberg
  Constantinople, translated by Mrs. J. Colombe, Hachette et Compagnie, 1878. Also at Google Books

1877 books
Istanbul
Works about the Ottoman Empire
Travel books
Orientalism
Italian-language books
Eastern culture